Dixson is a surname. Notable people with the surname include:

Alice Dixson (born 1969), Filipino American actress, commercial model, and former beauty queen
Hugh Dixson (1841–1926), Australian business man and philanthropist
Hugh Robert Dixson (1865–1940), Australian businessman, parliamentarian and philanthropist
Julius Dixson (1913–2004), African-American songwriter and record company executive
Miriam Dixson (born 1930), Australian social historian and author
Robert James Dixson (1908–1963), American writer, simplified and adapted some classic works of literature
Thomas Dixson (1733–1809), British colonial militiaman and politician serving in Canada
Darius "DIXSON" Scott, American musician and Academy Award-nominated co-writer of "Be Alive"

See also
Dixson Island (Antarctica)
Dickson (disambiguation)
Dixon (disambiguation)